Aleksandra Davidovna Rudes (born 10 July 1930) is a Soviet mezzo-soprano opera singer and recipient of the Merited Artist of the RSFSR and People's Artist of the RSFSR awards.

Biography 
Rudes was born in the city of Odessa. During Siege of Odessa, she and her family were evacuated from the city until their eventual return after the war. After graduating from the Odessa Conservatory (today called the Odessa National Music Academy) in 1962, she performed for the Moldova National Opera Ballet theater. In 1963 she joined the Saratov , where she performed for over 20 years and received the Merited Artist of the RSFSR award in 1969 and the People's Artist of the RSFSR award in 1978. She has been described as a legendary name, whose voice gave goosebumps to those who heard her performances.

She currently resides in New York City.

References

External links 

 Musical Academy Journal's Profile of Aleksandra Rudes, p. 154 (p. 6 in the link) (in Russian)
 Saratov Opera and Ballet History – A. Rudes mentioned in '1956' section
 Russian Movie/Theater Biography (in Russian)
 Saratov Philharmonic (in Russian)
 70th anniversary of Saratov Philharmonic (in Russian)
 Symphony of Friendship news article (in Russian)
 Saratov cultural website (in Russian)
 Chabad Newsletter (in Russian, mentioned p. 8)
 Saratov Tourist Portal (in Russian, mentioned)
 

1930 births
Musicians from Odesa
20th-century Ukrainian women opera singers
Soviet women opera singers
Operatic mezzo-sopranos
Living people